Bruce Leslie McLaren (30 August 1937 – 2 June 1970) was a New Zealand racing car designer, driver, engineer, and inventor.

His name lives on in the McLaren team which has been one of the most successful in Formula One championship history, winning a total of 8 World Constructors' Championships and 12 World Drivers' Championships. McLaren cars dominated CanAm sports car racing with 56 wins, a considerable number of them with him behind the wheel, between 1967 and 1972 (and five constructors' championships), and have won three Indianapolis 500 races, as well as the 24 Hours of Le Mans and 12 Hours of Sebring.

Early life
Born in Auckland, New Zealand, Bruce McLaren attended Meadowbank Primary School. As a nine-year-old, he was diagnosed with Perthes disease in his hip that left his left leg shorter than the right.

His parents, Les and Ruth McLaren, owned a service station and workshop in Remuera Rd, Remuera, Auckland; Les McLaren had been a motorcycle racing enthusiast, but gave that up due to an injury before Bruce's birth, and began racing cars at the club level instead. Bruce spent all of his free hours hanging around the workshop and developed his passion during his formative years.

Career
Les McLaren restored an Austin 7 Ulster, which 14-year-old Bruce used in 1952 when he entered his first competition, a hillclimb. Two years later, he took part in his first real race and showed promise. He moved up from the Austin to a Ford 10 special and an Austin-Healey, then a Formula Two (F2) Cooper-Climax sports racing car. He immediately began to modify, improve and master it, so much so that he was runner-up in the 1957–58 New Zealand championship series.

McLaren founded McLaren Automotive in 1963.

Driving career

Grand Prix

His performance in the New Zealand Grand Prix in 1958 was noticed by Australian driver Jack Brabham (who would later invite McLaren to drive for him). Because of his obvious potential, the New Zealand International Grand Prix organisation selected him for its 'Driver to Europe' scheme designed to give a promising Kiwi driver year-round experience with the best in the world. McLaren was the first recipient, to be followed by others later including Denny Hulme.
McLaren went to Cooper and stayed seven years. He raced in F2 and was entered in the German Grand Prix at the Nürburgring in which F2 and F1 cars competed together. He astounded the motor racing fraternity by being the first F2, and fifth overall, in a field of the best drivers in the world.

McLaren joined the Cooper factory F1 team alongside Jack Brabham in 1959 and won the 1959 United States Grand Prix at age 22 years 104 days, becoming the youngest ever GP winner (not including the Indianapolis 500) up to that time. This record would stand for more than four decades until Fernando Alonso's victory at the 2003 Hungarian Grand Prix. He followed that with a win in the Argentine Grand Prix, the first race of the 1960 Formula One season, and he would finish runner-up that season to Brabham.

McLaren won the 1962 Monaco Grand Prix, eventually finishing a fine third in the championship that year. The next year, he founded Bruce McLaren Motor Racing Ltd, which remains in the Formula One championship simply as McLaren. McLaren continued to race and win in Coopers (including the New Zealand GP in 1964).

McLaren left Cooper at the end of 1965, and announced his own GP racing team, with co-driver and fellow Kiwi Chris Amon. Amon left in 1967 to drive for Ferrari. In 1968, McLaren was joined by another fellow Kiwi Denny Hulme, who had become world champion in 1967 with Brabham. McLaren took his fourth career win racing his own McLaren car at Spa in 1968, achieving the team's first Grand Prix win. Hulme won twice in the McLaren-Ford.

The  championship was also a success, with McLaren finishing third in the standings despite taking no wins. In tribute to his homeland, McLaren's cars featured the "speedy Kiwi" logo.

Can-Am series 
McLaren's design flair and ingenuity were graphically demonstrated in powerful sports car racing. Just as the Can-Am began to become very popular with fans in Canada and the U.S., the new McLaren cars finished second twice, and third twice, in six races.

In 1967, they won five of six races and in 1968, four of six. The following year, McLarens proved unbeatable, winning all 11 races. In two races, they finished 1–2–3.

24 Hours of Le Mans 

In 1965, McLaren and co-driver Ken Miles raced a Ford GT40 in the 24 Hour Race at Le Mans. The car was leading after 45 laps but retired due to gearbox failure. In 1966, McLaren and co-driver Chris Amon won the race in a Ford GT40, in a Ford 1-2-3 finish. The Ken Miles-Denny Hulme entry crossed the line first but travelled less distance due to the Le Mans style start.

Career as a constructor 
McLaren was a competitive driver, but his legacy, the McLaren Racing Team, stems from his abilities as an analyst, engineer, and manager. In the early days of McLaren sports cars, McLaren was testing and as he drove out of the pits, he noticed the fuel filler access door was flapping up and down as he drove. The current aerodynamic thinking was that it should have been pressed more firmly in place as the speed of the car increased. Instead, it bounced more vigorously as the speed increased. Instantly, his frustration at the sloppy work changed and he had an insight. Stopping in the pits, he grabbed a pair of shears, and started cutting the bodywork away behind the radiator. Climbing back in the car, he immediately began turning lap times faster than before.

Later he explained, I was first angry that the filler door hadn't been properly closed but then I began to wonder why it wasn't being pressed down by the airflow. The only answer was that there had to be a source of higher pressure air under it than over it. From that session came the "nostrils" that have been a key McLaren design feature, including in the McLaren P1 road car.

McLaren noticed that his team's cars were less innovative than the Chaparrals of rival driver/designer Jim Hall, but their superior reliability was rewarded by race and championship victories. That culture continued after his death and when Ron Dennis bought the team was reinforced by the lessons learned in his early career as a race mechanic.

Death
Bruce McLaren died aged 32 when his Can-Am car crashed on the Lavant Straight just before Woodcote corner at Goodwood Circuit in England on 2 June 1970. He had been testing his new McLaren M8D when the rear bodywork came adrift at speed. The loss of aerodynamic downforce destabilised the car, which spun, left the track, and hit a bunker used as a flag station.

Motorsport author Eoin Young said that Bruce McLaren had "virtually penned his own epitaph" in his 1964 book From the Cockpit. Referring to the death of teammate Timmy Mayer, McLaren had written:

McLaren was survived by his sisters Pat and Jan, wife Patty and daughter Amanda. He was buried at Waikumete Cemetery in Glen Eden.

Legacy
 The team Bruce McLaren founded in 1963 would continue on after his death and win 8 Constructors' Championships and 12 Drivers' Championships in Formula One.
 Bruce McLaren Intermediate School in West Auckland was named after him shortly after his death. It was originally going to be called Henderson South Intermediate. The school is on Bruce McLaren Road, in the suburb of McLaren Park.
 In 2015 the Taupo Motorsport Park in New Zealand was renamed Bruce McLaren Motorsport Park.
 In 2000, Motorsport NZ and the Prodrive Trust created the Bruce McLaren Scholarship to help up-and-coming New Zealand racing drivers.
 Inducted into the New Zealand Sports Hall of Fame in 1990.
 Inducted into the International Motorsports Hall of Fame in 1991.
 Inducted into the Indianapolis Motor Speedway Hall of Fame in 1991.
 Inducted into the New Zealand Motorsports Wall of Fame in 1994.
 Inducted into the Motorsports Hall of Fame of America in 1995.
 The Bruce McLaren Trust, based in Auckland, New Zealand, perpetuates his memory and runs a small museum, formerly located in the flat where Bruce grew up (above a petrol station in Remuera), now located at Hampton Downs Motorsport Park. 
 On 20 January 2007, at New Zealand's round of the A1 Grand Prix series, it was announced that a movie was to be made about Bruce McLaren.
 On 21 February 2017 it was announced that Roger Donaldson would be making a movie called McLaren.
 The University of Auckland Formula SAE team use Bruce's racing number 47 as their car number in memory of Bruce.
 Inducted into the New Zealand Business Hall of Fame in 2022.

Film

The story of Bruce McLaren was told in the 2017 documentary film McLaren by Roger Donaldson.

Racing record

Complete Formula One World Championship results
(key) (Races in italics indicate fastest lap)

* McLaren was ineligible to score points in the 1958 German Grand Prix because he was driving a Formula Two car.

Non-championship results
(key) (Races in bold indicate pole position) (Races in italics indicate fastest lap)

Complete 24 Hours of Le Mans results

Complete British Saloon Car Championship results
(key) (Races in bold indicate pole position; races in italics indicate fastest lap.)

Complete Tasman Series results

Complete Canadian-American Challenge Cup results
(key) (Races in bold indicate pole position) (Races in italics indicate fastest lap)

* Joint fastest lap.

References

Related Books:
 From the Cockpit by Bruce McLaren
 Bruce McLaren: Racing Car Constructor by George Begg
 McLaren – The Man, Cars & Team by Eoin Young
 Eoin Young's McLaren Book
 The Last Season – The Life of Bruce McLaren by Jeanne Beeching
 The Golden Era of New Zealand Motor Racing by Graham Vercoe
A list of further such volumes can be viewed at Historical Books -- Bruce McLaren Trust - History of motorsport racing legend and founder of McLaren F1 and Can-Am teams.

External links
 McLaren Racing official site
Bruce McLaren Trust official site
 New Zealand Sports Hall of Fame
Bruce McLaren Biography

New Zealand racing drivers
New Zealand Formula One drivers
Sportspeople from Auckland
Formula One team owners
Formula One team principals
Formula One designers
Formula One race winners
Cooper Formula One drivers
McLaren Formula One drivers
Anglo American Racers Formula One drivers
24 Hours of Le Mans drivers
24 Hours of Le Mans winning drivers
12 Hours of Reims drivers
World Sportscar Championship drivers
International Motorsports Hall of Fame inductees
BRDC Gold Star winners
Segrave Trophy recipients
Tasman Series drivers
McLaren people
Racing drivers who died while racing
Sport deaths in England
1937 births
1970 deaths
12 Hours of Sebring drivers
New Zealand motorsport people
British Touring Car Championship drivers
People from Auckland
Sports car racing team owners
IndyCar Series team owners
Burials at Waikumete Cemetery